Kattur is a small village in Thanjavur district, Tamil Nadu, India. Near to Central university of Thiruvarur. It is situated 12 km west of the Thiruvar city (between the Thiruvarur to Kumbakonam highway).

Demographics 
In the 2001 census, Kattur had a total population of 1,773, consisting of 887 males and 886 females. The literacy rate was 71.61 percent.

References 
 

Villages in Thanjavur district